Steyr is a city in Upper Austria. 

Steyr may also refer to:

Places
 Steyr (river), a river in Upper Austria
 Steyr-Land District, a district of the state of Upper Austria in Austria
 Aschach an der Steyr, a municipality in this district
 Sankt Ulrich bei Steyr, a municipality in this district

Companies
 Steyr-Daimler-Puch, formerly a large manufacturing conglomerate based in Steyr, Austria
 Magna Steyr, an automotive manufacturer, originally part of this company
 Steyr automobile, a former car brand of this company
 Steyr Mannlicher, a firearms manufacturer, originally part of this company, now known as Steyr Arms
 Steyr Motors GmbH, a manufacturer of diesel-engines, originally part of this company
 Steyr Tractor, a former marquee of this company, now part of CNH Industrial
 Steyr Arms, an Austria-based firearms manufacturer, formerly known as Steyr Mannlicher
 9×23mm Steyr, a centerfire pistol cartridge developed for the M1912 pistol
 Steyr AUG, a rifle manufactured by this company (introduced c. 1978)
 Steyr GB, a handgun manufactured by this company (introduced c. 1968)
 Steyr M, a handgun manufactured by this company (introduced c. 1999)
 Steyr M1912 pistol, a handgun manufactured by this company (introduced c. 1912)
 Steyr Model 1912 Mauser, a rifle manufactured by this company (introduced c. 1912)
 Steyr TMP, a machine pistol manufactured by this company (introduced c. 1992)

See also 
 Steir, a surname
 Steyer (disambiguation)
 Stayer (disambiguation)